Miguel Ángel Mena (born 7 July 1997) is a Nicaraguan swimmer. He competed in the men's 100 metre freestyle event at the 2016 Summer Olympics where he ranked 55th with a time of 53.40 seconds. He did not advance to the semifinals.

In 2019, he represented Nicaragua at the 2019 World Aquatics Championships held in Gwangju, South Korea and he finished in 78th place in the heats in the men's 50 metre freestyle event. In the men's 100 metre freestyle he finished in 75th place in the heats.

References

External links
 

1997 births
Living people
Nicaraguan male freestyle swimmers
Olympic swimmers of Nicaragua
Swimmers at the 2016 Summer Olympics
Swimmers at the 2020 Summer Olympics
Pan American Games competitors for Nicaragua
Swimmers at the 2015 Pan American Games
Swimmers at the 2019 Pan American Games